Börries Albrecht Conon August Heinrich Freiherr von Münchhausen (20 March 1874 – 16 March 1945) was a German poet and Nazi activist.

Biography

He was born in Hildesheim, the eldest child of Kammerherr Börries von Münchhausen and his wife, Clementine von der Gablentz. At 13, he was sent to Ilfeld to the monastery school. He studied law and political science at the universities of Heidelberg, Munich, Göttingen, and Berlin. He received his degree from the University of Leipzig.

While he was still a student, he composed a number of ballads and published his first collection of poetry in 1898, which expressed adherence to German Romantic poets' fascination with the Middle Ages and the world of German legend. All his works appeared around the turn of the century. After World War I, his popularity quickly waned. His position became more and more reactionary with the founding of the  Deutsche Dichterakademie, with its seat on the Wartburg, which belonged to von Münchhausen's cousin Hans von der Gabelentz. The motto of the academy was to be "German, Christian, and above all conscious of tradition."

With Hitler's rise to power, many of the members of the Prussian Academy of Sciences in Berlin were either dismissed or resigned. This was von Münchhausen's chance, and he signed the Gelöbnis treuester Gefolgschaft, the vow of fidelity to Adolf Hitler and his friends from the Wartburg were elected to take the place of such writers as Alfred Döblin and Thomas Mann.

Last years and death

Von Münchhausen agreed with Hitler's Machtpolitik and worked hard to make the Prussian Academy into a German Academy. However, these efforts came to naught despite Hermann Göring's support. As Soviet troops approached his estate at Windischleuba, Baron von Münchhausen took an overdose of sleeping pills and died on 16 March 1945.

References

1874 births
1945 suicides
People from Hildesheim
People from the Province of Hanover
19th-century German poets
19th-century German male writers
19th-century German writers
Writers from Lower Saxony
Barons of Germany
Conservative Revolutionary movement
Drug-related suicides in Germany
20th-century German poets
Leipzig University alumni
Nazi Party members
German male poets
German-language poets
German nationalists
Nazis who committed suicide in Germany